London, Midland and Scottish Railway Jubilee Class 5593 (BR number 45593) named Kolhapur is a preserved British steam locomotive.

Revenue service
5593 was built in 1934 by the North British Locomotive Company of Glasgow, Works number 24151, and part of Lot 118, to a design by William Stanier.  In May 1936 it was named Kolhapur after Kolhapur, a princely state in western India.

Initially built with a low degree superheat domeless boiler, 5593 received a domed boiler in April 1937.

5593 hauled the train carrying Winston Churchill from Liverpool on his return from talks with President Roosevelt in 1942.

After nationalisation in 1948, it was renumbered 45593 by British Railways in December of that year. It was allocated to various sheds during the 1950s and 1960s, including Longsight, Carlisle Upperby, Willesden, Aston, Burton, Patricroft and Newton Heath.

On 23 March 1965, 5593 was transferred to Leeds Holbeck and was kept there in good condition to work railtours over the Settle-Carlisle line. The locomotive was also given a yellow cabside warning stripe to indicate that it was barred from the electrified West Coast Main Line south of Crewe where it was out-of-gauge. Kolhapur was withdrawn in October 1967.

Preservation

45593 was bought in good condition January 1968 by the then Standard Gauge Steam Trust. It was restored during the 1980s to LMS crimson lake livery. In 1994, it temporarily assumed the identity and special livery of scrapped sister and class pioneer 5552 Silver Jubilee for the silver jubilee of the Great Central Railway.  45593 was repainted into BR green in 1995.

In 2008, Kolhapur appeared at the York Railfest along with Castle 7029 Clun Castle. It returned to Tyseley for the Tyseley 100 celebrations. For this, it was going to be repainted into LMS crimson lake livery but this was never applied.

As of April 2022, 45593 is currently out of service at Tyseley Locomotive Works, awaiting an overhaul.

References

External links

 Jubilees page
 Railuk database

5593 Kolhapur
Preserved London, Midland and Scottish Railway steam locomotives
Standard gauge steam locomotives of Great Britain
Railway locomotives introduced in 1934